Route 35 is a state highway in Connecticut, located entirely within the town of Ridgefield, Fairfield County. Route 35 starts at the New York state line, where the road continues as New York State Route 35, and ends at U.S. Route 7. The road is often used as an alternative to the congested Route 7. Originally part of New England Route 3 in the 1920s, Route 35 was designated in 1932.

Route description

It then turns north along Main Street, taking over Route 33. After downtown Ridgefield, Route 35 turns right on Danbury Road while Route 116 begins straight ahead. Route 35 then proceeds in a northeast direction until it meets U.S. Route 7 about  later. Danbury Road continues as US 7.

History
Modern Danbury Road in Ridgefield and Sugar Hollow Road in Danbury was first laid out as a turnpike in 1801 by the Danbury and Ridgefield Turnpike Corporation. The turnpike connected Ridgefield center and downtown Danbury. Tolls continued to be collected on the road until 1860 when the charter of the corporation was repealed.

Route 35 was originally part of New England Route 3 (designated in 1922), which was part of the main route connecting New York City and Hartford via Bedford and Danbury. Most of Route 3 became co-signed as U.S. Route 6 east of Danbury in 1927. A small portion south of Danbury was also assigned as part of U.S. Route 7 about a year later. In the 1932 state highway renumbering, the New England road numbering system was abandoned and the remaining section of old Route 3 west of US 7 was then designated as Route 35. Originally, Route 35 used West Lane from the state line to Main Street. This was realigned by 1934 to use South Salem Road (the modern alignment) instead. The original 35 became Route 35A. In 1963, this was renumbered as unsigned State Road 835. Around 1942, New York designated the continuation across the state line as New York State Route 35, creating a unified route from Peekskill to Ridgefield.

Major intersections

References

External links

035
Transportation in Fairfield County, Connecticut
Ridgefield, Connecticut